This article contains a list of fossil-bearing stratigraphic units in Palau.

Sites

See also

 Lists of fossiliferous stratigraphic units in Oceania

References
 

Palau
Paleontology in Palau
Geology of Palau
Palau geography-related lists